Laugh It Off is a 1940 British musical comedy film directed by John Baxter and Wallace Orton, and starring Tommy Trinder, Jean Colin, Anthony Hulme and Marjorie Browne. It was filmed at Walton Studios starting in November 1939, just after the outbreak of war.

Plot
At the start of World War II, Concert party entertainer Tommy Towers is drafted into service. He immediately gets on the wrong side of commanding officer Sergeant Major Slaughter, but after saving the camp show with his show business expertise Tommy is granted a commission.

Cast
 Tommy Trinder as Tommy Towers
 Jean Colin as Sally
 Anthony Hulme as Somers
 Marjorie Browne as Peggy
 Edward Lexy as Sergeant Major Slaughter
 Ida Barr as Mrs McNab
 Charles Victor as Colonel
 Peter Gawthorne as General
 Wally Patch as Sergeant
 Warren Jenkins as Pat
 John Laurie as Jock
 Henry Lytton, Jr. as George

Critical reception
TV Guide called it "a fairly entertaining effort".

Contains the mortal line: “Well if I were you, I wouldn’t start from here!” when a private is giving directions to a General in a car trying to find the HQ.

References

Bibliography
 Low, Rachael. Filmmaking in 1930s Britain. George Allen & Unwin, 1985.
 Wood, Linda. British Films, 1927-1939. British Film Institute, 1986.

External links

1940 films
British musical comedy films
1940 musical comedy films
1940s English-language films
Films shot at Nettlefold Studios
Films directed by John Baxter
Military humor in film
World War II films made in wartime
British black-and-white films